State Highway 15 (SH 15) is a State Highway in Kerala that starts from 
Ettumanoor and ends at Pulikkal junction. The highway is 57.3 km long.

Route description 
Ettumanoor (MC Road SH 01) - Kothanalloor - Kuruppumthara - Thalayolaparambu- Vaikom- Udayamperoor - Thripunithura - Vyttila - Pulikkal junction (joins with NH 47)

See also 

Roads in Kerala
List of State Highways in Kerala

References 

State Highways in Kerala
Roads in Ernakulam district
Roads in Kottayam district